The following highways are numbered 460:

Australia
 Strzelecki Highway

Canada
 New Brunswick Route 460
 Newfoundland and Labrador Route 460

Ireland
R460 road (Ireland)

Japan
 Japan National Route 460

United States
  U.S. Route 460
  Louisiana Highway 460
  Maryland Route 460
  New Mexico State Road 460
  Puerto Rico Highway 460
  South Carolina Highway 460
  Tennessee State Route 460 (proposed)